The Embassy of Laos in London is the diplomatic mission of Laos in the United Kingdom. It opened in 2014 after a 29-year gap.

The embassy provides consular services, such as visa applications and passport renewals, as well as promoting cultural and economic relations between Laos and the UK.

References

Laos
Diplomatic missions of Laos
Laos–United Kingdom relations
Buildings and structures in the City of Westminster
Bayswater